Albert Miller Lea (July 23, 1808 – January 16, 1891) was an American engineer, soldier, and topographer with the United States Dragoons who surveyed southern Minnesota and northern Iowa in 1835.

Biography
Lea was born in Richland, Tennessee, a small village not far from Knoxville. He attended the United States Military Academy. He graduated fifth of 33 cadets in the Class of 1831. Due to his high class ranking, he was assigned to the engineers and posted to Fort Des Moines in the Iowa Territory, serving until his resignation in May 1836. In 1837, despite his youth, he became the Chief Engineer for the state of Tennessee. He then worked for the Federal government determining the boundary between Iowa and Missouri. From 1839 to 1840, he was an assistant engineer on the Baltimore and Ohio Railroad. He became a brigadier general in the Iowa militia and then the chief clerk for the U.S. War Department.

In 1844, he earned his master's degree in engineering from East Tennessee University in Knoxville and joined the faculty as an instructor. From 1849 to 1854, was the city engineer for Knoxville, as well as managing a local glass manufacturing company. He moved to East Texas in 1855.

During the American Civil War, Lea was an engineering officer in the Confederate States Army with the rank of major (later, lieutenant colonel). During the Battle of Galveston on New Year's Day 1863, his 25-year-old son, Lt. Commander Edward Lea of the Union Navy, was mortally wounded while serving on the USRC Harriet Lane. Lea himself was among the Confederate officers who boarded the captured ship, and found his son shortly before his death.

After the war, Lea lived in Galveston for several years. He moved in 1874 to Corsicana, Texas, where he purchased a farm. He died of heart failure in 1891 and was buried in Oakwood Cemetery in Corsicana.

The city of Albert Lea, Minnesota, is named in his honor.

See also

Notes

References
 Block, W. T., "A Towering East Texas Pioneer: A Biographical Sketch of Colonel Albert Miller Lea." East Texas Historical Journal, Volume XXXII, Number 2 (1993), pp. 23–33.

American militia generals
Baltimore and Ohio Railroad people
Confederate States Army officers
People from Galveston, Texas
People from Grainger County, Tennessee
People from Knoxville, Tennessee
People of Texas in the American Civil War
United States Army colonels
United States Military Academy alumni
1808 births
1891 deaths
United States Army officers
Military personnel from Texas